{{Infobox person
| name               = Brooke Burke
| image              = Brooke Burke 2021.jpg
| caption            = Burke in 2021
| birth_name         = Brooke Lisa Burke
| birth_date         = 
| birth_place        = Hartford, Connecticut, U.S.
| spouse             = 
| children           = 4
| years_active       = 1986–present
| occupation         =  Television personality, fitness personality, author, actress, businesswoman
| notable_works      = {{ubl|Host or co-host of:| Wild On!|[[Rock Star (TV series)|CBS' Rock Star]]|She's Got the Look|Dancing with the Stars}}
}}

Brooke Lisa Burke (born September 8, 1971) is an American television personality, fitness personality, author, actress, and businesswoman. She is known for hosting the E! Network travel show Wild On! (1999–2002), CBS' Rock Star (2005–2006), and TV Lands' She's Got the Look (2010). After winning the seventh season of Dancing with the Stars, Burke served as co-hostess of the show from season ten to season seventeen (2010–2013). In 2017, Burke launched "Brooke Burke Body", a fitness app with workout videos featuring her.

Early life
Brooke Lisa Burke was born in Hartford, Connecticut and raised in Tucson, Arizona, the younger of two siblings born to Donna and George Burke. Her mother is of half Portuguese background; she was adopted and then raised Jewish. Her father is of Irish and French descent and left the family when she was two years old. She was thereafter raised by her Armenian stepfather in her mother's Jewish faith. She is raising her children Jewish, although she also celebrates Christmas.

She attended both Sahuaro High School and Palo Verde High School in Tucson where she was homecoming queen in 1989. She later studied broadcast journalism.

Career

Television
After rising to national fame as a lingerie model for the Frederick's of Hollywood catalog in the early 1990's, Brooke was tapped to serve as the host of the popular E! travel series Wild On! from 1999–2002. In 2005, Brooke landed her first primetime network hosting gig on CBS's Rock Star: INXS (2005) and the subsequent Rock Star: Super Nova, both produced by Mark Burnett.

In 2010, Burke became the host of She's Got the Look on TV Land, a modeling competition series for women over 35. That same year, she was named co-hostess of ABC's Dancing with the Stars, where she remained for seven seasons (2010–2013).

Burke served as the co-host of the Miss America pageant in 2011, 2012, 2013, and 2016.

From 2016–2018, Burke hosted and co-produced the Saturday morning show Hidden Heroes, a hidden camera television show developed for teenagers in which each episode reveals the widespread goodwill in our world by secretly capturing heroes in action.

Her other television credits include hosting the digital series and network show I Dare You on TV Land (2018) as well as a recurring role on Melissa & Joey (2014–2015).

 Dancing with the Stars performances 
On November 25, 2008, Burke, with Derek Hough as her partner, won the seventh season of Dancing with the Stars beating Super Bowl champion Warren Sapp and his partner Kym Johnson. Burke shares the honor of being one of only three contestants to spend eight out of ten weeks at the top of the leaderboard. The other two contestants to achieve this feat are Kristi Yamaguchi and Nicole Scherzinger.

Magazine appearances
Burke has featured on the cover of many fitness, fashion, and lifestyle magazines, including Fitness, Women's Health, Redbook, and Ladies Home Journal. She also has appeared in numerous men's interest magazines such as Maxim, Stuff, Playboy, and FHM.

Entrepreneurial ventures
In 2007, Burke founded and launched BabooshBaby.com, the online store for her popular post-pregnancy belly wraps Tauts. Brooke later developed Baboosh Body, a fitness product (belly wrap) made to trim the tummy.

In 2011, she launched the online community for mothers, ModernMom.com, of which she remains the co-CEO.

In 2012, Burke brought her own personal brand of fitness workouts to consumers via a DVD series with Sony Pictures Home Entertainment. The four DVD series consisted of Transform Your Body with Brooke Burke: Strength & Condition, Transform Your Body with Brooke Burke: Tone & Tighten, Brooke Burke Body: Sexy Abs, and Brooke Burke Body: 30-Day Slimdown.

Inspired by her dedication to promote women's awareness of the importance of physical and mental health, Brooke's next fitness project was to create her signature "Booty Burn" workout which she personally teaches in her hometown of Malibu, California. In 2017, Burke launched Brooke Burke Body, a fitness lifestyle app.

On May 17, 2022, it was announced that Brooke Burke Body had teamed up with LaPlage Wellness Retreat, with Burke being named Creative Director of Operations. In her new role, Burke will create and facilitate holistic wellness retreats that combine the experience of Brooke Burke Body with the one-of-a-kind unique and life-changing experiences for which La Plage Wellness is famous.

Books
Burke wrote her first book "The Naked Mom: A Modern Mom's Fearless Revelations, Savvy Advice, and Soulful Reflections" in 2011. In it, she reflects on motherhood, Hollywood, romance, and the challenges of creating a blended family. In 2016, she co-authored her second book, "Chicken Soup for the Soul: The Joy of Less", a guide to simplifying your life with Amy Newmark.

Video games
Burke served as the face and voice of "Rachel Teller" in Electronic Arts' video game Need for Speed: Underground 2, for which she won a Spike Video Game Award. She is also the voice of "People and Places" in Trivial Pursuit: Unhinged. She also voiced the character"the subservient chicken" in an early 2000s game called "BK Big Bumpin" 

Podcast
Since January 2020, Burke has co-hosted an iHeartRadio podcast titled Intimate Knowledge with former The Real Housewives of Orange County'' star Meghan King Edmonds and Lila Darville.

Personal life
Burke was married twice and engaged once more. She was first engaged to Joseph Benjamin, a gas station owner in Los Angeles. Her first marriage was in 2001 to Garth Fisher, a plastic surgeon. They divorced in 2005. She raises their two daughters, Neriah and Sierra, in her Jewish faith.

In 2006, Burke began dating actor and singer David Charvet whom she married on August 12, 2011; Brooke announced that she would take her husband's last name and be known as Brooke Burke-Charvet. Together they have a daughter (Heaven Rain, born 2007) and a son (Shaya Braven, born 2008). After seven years of marriage, the couple announced that they were divorcing in April 2018. Their divorce was finalized in March 2020.

 Burke had been in a relationship with Scott Rigsby since August 2019.

On November 8, 2012, Burke announced she had thyroid cancer and underwent surgery to remove her thyroid. She became the face of the American Cancer Society's "Bucket List" campaign in 2014.

Filmography

Film

Television

Video games

References

External links
 
 

Living people
20th-century American actresses
21st-century American actresses
Actresses from Hartford, Connecticut
Actresses from Tucson, Arizona
American film actresses
American game show hosts
American people of French descent
American people of Irish descent
American people of Portuguese descent
American television actresses
Beauty pageant hosts
Dancing with the Stars (American TV series) winners
Female models from Connecticut
Jewish American actresses
Jewish female models
Participants in American reality television series
Sahuaro High School alumni
University of California, Los Angeles alumni
1971 births
The Apprentice (franchise) contestants
21st-century American Jews